Texans for Fiscal Accountability is a political action committee linked to consulting firm Murphy Turner and Associates.

Background
Texans for Fiscal Accountability is a political action committee set up before the 2012 primary. Beginning in 2012 the group engaged in campaign activities according to subscription news website Capitol Insider.

Funding
According to the Texas Ethics Commission, Texans for Fiscal Accountability has received contributions from Urban Rural Community Conservation Political action committee and four individuals.

Action against Murphy Turner
Michael Quinn Sullivan filed the name Texans with Fiscal Accountability with the state of Texas, and then issued a cease and desist letter to Murphy Tuner and Associates after learning of Texans for Fiscal Accountability's activities.

Texans for Fiscal Accountability is not affiliated with Empower Texans.

References

United States political action committees